Avacopan, sold under the brand name Tavneos, is a medication used to treat anti-neutrophil cytoplasmic autoantibody-associated vasculitis. Avacopan is a complement 5a receptor antagonist and a cytochrome P450 3A4 inhibitor.

The most common side effects include nausea (feeling sick), headache, decrease in white blood cell count, upper respiratory tract (nose and throat) infection, diarrhea, vomiting, and nasopharyngitis (inflammation of the nose and throat).

Avacopan was approved for medical use in Japan in September 2021, and in the United States in October 2021. It is the first orally-administered inhibitor of the complement C5a receptor approved by the US Food and Drug Administration (FDA). The FDA considers it to be a first-in-class medication.

Medical uses 
In the United States, avacopan is indicated as an adjunctive treatment of adults with severe active anti-neutrophil cytoplasmic autoantibody-associated vasculitis (granulomatosis with polyangiitis and microscopic polyangiitis) in combination with standard therapy including glucocorticoids.

In the European Union, avacopan, in combination with a rituximab or cyclophosphamide regimen, is indicated for the treatment of adults with severe, active granulomatosis with polyangiitis or microscopic polyangiitis.

Society and culture

Legal status 
In November 2021, the Committee for Medicinal Products for Human Use of the European Medicines Agency (EMA) adopted a positive opinion, recommending the granting of a marketing authorization for the medicinal product Tavneos, intended, in combination with a rituximab or cyclophosphamide regimen, for the treatment of adults with severe, active granulomatosis with polyangiitis or microscopic polyangiitis. The applicant for this medicinal product is Vifor Fresenius Medical Care Renal Pharma France. The EMA considers avacopan to be a first-in-class medicine. Avacopan was approved for medical use in the European Union in January 2022.

The FDA granted the application for avacopan orphan drug designation.

Names 
Avacopan is the international nonproprietary name.

References

Further reading

External links 
 
 

Orphan drugs
Fluoroarenes
Trifluoromethyl compounds
Amides
Anilines
Piperidines
Cyclopentyl compounds